Zwijndrecht may refer to:

 Zwijndrecht, Belgium, a town in Belgium
 Zwijndrecht, Netherlands, a town in the Netherlands